Rob Gray (November 24, 1962 – December 21, 2016) was an award-winning Canadian production designer and art director.

Recognition 
 2007 Genie Award for Best Achievement in Art Direction/Production Design - Fido - Won (shared with James Willcock)
 2006 Gemini Award for Best Production Design or Art Direction in a Dramatic Program or Series - The Love Crimes of Gillian Guess - Nominated
 2004 Genie Award for Best Achievement in Art Direction/Production Design - Falling Angels - Won (shared with Christina Kuhnigk)
 2004 DGC Craft Award for Outstanding Achievement in Production Design - Feature Film - Falling Angels - Nominated
 2003 DGC Craft Award for Outstanding Achievement in Production Design - Long Form - The Bay of Love and Sorrows - Nominated
 2017 Dedication - Cardinal

References

External links 
 

1962 births
2016 deaths
Canadian art directors
Best Art Direction/Production Design Genie and Canadian Screen Award winners
Canadian production designers